Kenneth Elwood Moffett (September 11, 1931 – November 19, 2021) was an American federal mediator and union official. He was the former executive director of the baseball players’ union. Joseph A. McCartin of Georgetown University called Moffett “one of the most skilled and dedicated mediators to have emerged in U.S. labor relations in the postwar era.”

References

1931 births
2021 deaths